Ab Mu-ye Sofla (also Romanized as Āb Mū-ye Soflá; also known as Āb Mow and Ābmū Soflá) is a village in Tayebi-ye Garmsiri-ye Jonubi Rural District, in the Central District of Kohgiluyeh County, Kohgiluyeh and Boyer-Ahmad Province, Iran. At the 2006 census, its population was 38, in 9 families.

References 

Populated places in Kohgiluyeh County